The Ririe B Pegram Truss Railroad Bridge is a Pegram truss railroad bridge which crosses the flood channel of the Snake River north of Ririe, Idaho. The bridge was originally constructed for a Union Pacific Railroad crossing in Nyssa, Oregon in 1894 and was relocated to its current site in 1914, where it carried Oregon Short Line Railroad tracks. The bridge's Pegram truss design was the work of George H. Pegram, the chief engineer for Union Pacific; as Pegram held a patent on the design, all surviving Pegram truss bridges were commissioned during Pegram's tenure with the Union Pacific and Missouri Pacific railroads.

The bridge was added to the National Register of Historic Places on July 25, 1997.

See also
 List of National Historic Landmarks in Idaho
 National Register of Historic Places listings in Jefferson County, Idaho
Ririe A Pegram Truss Railroad Bridge, another Pegram truss bridge on the East Belt Branch

References

Bridges completed in 1894
National Register of Historic Places in Jefferson County, Idaho
Railroad bridges on the National Register of Historic Places in Idaho
Relocated buildings and structures in Idaho
Truss bridges in the United States
Union Pacific Railroad bridges
Pegram trusses
1894 establishments in Oregon
Oregon Short Line Railroad
1914 establishments in Idaho
Bridges over the Snake River
Transportation in Jefferson County, Idaho
Nyssa, Oregon